Petko Vasilev Vasilev (born 16 January 1990 in Plovdiv) is a Bulgarian football player who played for Botev Plovdiv in the Bulgarian A PFG in the 2009–10 season, before that club suffered administrative relegation.

References

1990 births
Living people
Bulgarian footballers
Association football forwards
Botev Plovdiv players
First Professional Football League (Bulgaria) players